The 2004 Asian Rhythmic Gymnastics Championships was held in Yangzhou, China, June 10–13, 2004.

Medal winners

References 

Rhythmic Gymnastics Asian Championships
International gymnastics competitions hosted by China
2004 in gymnastics
2004 in Chinese sport